Freck Langsam is a German no-budget Gangster Comedy film. Written by Jürgen Becker and directed by Michael Schu, the spoken language is a Rhenish dialect of High German from the city of Trier, where the film is set.

Production 
The concept for the movie came from Michael Schu and Jürgen Becker in 2009. Originally planned to be a 10-minute short film, the project was able to be completed through the support of local businesses. With more than 70 actors working on the film without recognition, it was in production for a year and a half and took more than 400 hours to film.

Release 
The first trailer was released on YouTube in April 2010 and the premier was viewed by an audience of 1200 at the Europahalle theater in Trier. The film opened on 21 October 2010 at the Broadway Theater (also in Trier), becoming 7000 viewers in the first three weeks. At the time, no film in the five years preceding had sold more tickets at that theater, to include Harry Potter (film series). With an initial shipment of 5,000, the DVD was released on 9 December 2010 and by the end of January 2011 had sold 16,000 of the total 23,000 produced.

Plot 
The Trier Mob Boss develops a plan to steal the Holy Robes from the Trier Dom, and sell it off to the highest bidder from the international mafia. A dopey detective and his corrupt boss try to stop it. It comes to a showdown in a rock quarry.

References

External links 
 
 Freck Langsam on Facebook
 Freck Langsam at Moviepilot.de
 Freck Langsam at Zelluloid.de
 Freck Langsam at Kino.de
 Freck Langsam - Keine Parodie auf Bruce Willis" auf www.hunderttausend.de

2010 films
Culture in Trier